Szczyglice  is a village in the administrative district of Gmina Zabierzów, within Kraków County, Lesser Poland Voivodeship, in southern Poland.

The village has a population of 590.

References

Szczyglice